This article contains past rosters  of the Galatasaray S.K. (women's volleyball) team.

1970 Era

1970–71
Roster

1971–72
Roster

1972–73
Roster

1973–74
Roster

1974–75
Roster

1975–76

1976–77

1977–78

1978–79

1979–80

1980 Era

1980–81

1981–82

1982–83

1983–84

1984–85

1985–86
Roster

1986–87
Roster

1987–88
Roster

1988–89
Roster

1989–90
Roster

1990 Era

1990–91
Roster

1991–92
Roster

1992–93
Roster

1993–94
Roster

1994–95
Roster

1995–96
Roster

1996–97
Roster

1997–98
Roster

1998–99
Roster

1999–00
Roster

2000 Era

2000–01
Roster

2001–02
Roster

2002–03
Roster

2003–04
Roster
Galatasaray withdrew from the league because it decided to close the volleyball branch.

2004–05
Roster

2005–06
Roster

2006–07
Roster

2007–08
Roster

2008–09
Roster

2009–10
Roster

2010 Era

2010–11
Roster

2011–12
Roster

2012–13
Roster

2013–14
Roster

2014–15
Roster

2015–16
Roster

2016–17
Roster

2017–18
Roster

2018–19
Roster

2019–20
Roster

2020 Era

2020–21
Roster

2021–22
Roster

References

 Galatasaray HDI Sigorta » players __ Women Volleybox.net

External links
 Official Galatasaray Volleyball Branch Website 
 Turkish Volleyball Federastion Official Website 

Galatasaray S.K. (women's volleyball)
Turkish women's volleyball club squads